Jesus Maria (Spanish: Jesús María) is an unincorporated community in Calaveras County, California. The community is in ZIP code 95222 and area code 209.

The community, the center of a large placer mining section, was named for a Mexican who raised vegetables and melons for the miners. It was settled in the early 1850s with a large population of Mexicans, French, Chileans, and Italians. Now it is only populated by a few families who live together and work for common goals, including a large community garden, basketball court, jungle gym for children, and a windmill to pump water.

Jesus Maria is registered as California Historical Landmark #284.

Politics

References

External links

Unincorporated communities in California
Unincorporated communities in Calaveras County, California
California Historical Landmarks